Clara Brown (born November 3, 1995) is an American para cyclist who competes in international level events in both track cycling and road cycling.

Sporting career

Early beginnings
Brown was a very active young person: she was a competitive artistic gymnast, runner and skier before her freak accident in March 2008 in a gymnastics training session; she sustained an incomplete spinal cord injury when she was twelve years old where she broke two vertebrae and was paralysed from the neck down. She spent many years of spinal cord and brain injury physical rehabilitation at Shepherd Center in Atlanta which gave her excruciating pain in her left leg caused by avascular necrosis before she joined her high school rowing team as a coxswain at Falmouth High School.

Discovery of para sport
She has mild hemiplegia on her left side but cannot feel anything from the neck down, she has very little motor function on her right side.

Brown bought her first modified road bike when she attended first year at University of Puget Sound to use as a means of transport and to keep fit and healthy. Her bike's modifications are the rear brake's lever is on the left due to her right hand almost paralysed, her bar end shifters are changed so that she could use her wrists to change gears. Once she graduated from college, she worked at a bike touring company and this was where she met someone who works for the Paralympic Advisory Committee and she then decided to join the United States Paralympic Committee to become a competitive para-cyclist.

Her first international competition was an invitation by her then-coach to participate in the Para-cycling World Cup in 2018 at Baie-Comeau in Canada where she was third in the road race and fourth in the time trial. She went to the 2019 UCI Para-cycling Road World Championships in Emmen, Netherlands and won two of her first medals in the competition: two bronze medals then in September, she went to represent the United States at the 2019 Parapan American Games in Lima, Peru where she won two gold medals and two silver medals in both road and track cycling events.

On April 17, 2021, Brown won the U.S. Paralympics Cycling Open for C3 15 km time trial in Huntsville, Alabama, qualifying her for the upcoming Tokyo 2020 Paralympic Games  (delayed until 2021 because of Covid-19).

References

External links
 
 

1995 births
Living people
Sportspeople from Portland, Maine
People from Falmouth, Maine
Paralympic cyclists of the United States
American female cyclists
University of Puget Sound alumni
Cyclists at the 2020 Summer Paralympics
21st-century American women
Cyclists from Maine
20th-century American women
Falmouth High School (Maine) alumni